Sir Alfred Stephen  (20 August 180215 October 1894) was an Australian judge and Chief Justice of New South Wales.

Early life
Stephen was born at St Christopher in the West Indies. His father, John Stephen (1771–1833), was related to James Stephen, became a barrister, and was Solicitor-General at St Christopher before his appointment as Solicitor-General of New South Wales in January 1824. He arrived at Sydney on 7 August 1824 and in September 1825 was made an acting judge of the Supreme Court. On 13 March 1826, his appointment as judge was confirmed. He resigned his position at the end of 1832 on account of ill-health and died on 21 December 1833.

Alfred Stephen was educated at Charterhouse School and Honiton grammar school in Devon. He returned to St Christopher for some years and then went to London to study law. In November 1823 he was called to the bar at Lincoln's Inn, and the following year sailed for Van Diemen's Land (Tasmania).

Van Diemen's Land
Stephen arrived at Hobart on 24 January 1825 and on 9 May was made solicitor-general, and 10 days later, crown solicitor. He allied himself with Governor Arthur who had clashed with Joseph Tice Gellibrand, the attorney-general. Stephen's resignation of his position in August 1825, and his charges against his brother officer's professional and public conduct brought the matter to a head. Stephen always took an extremely high-minded attitude about his own conduct in this matter.

As Solicitor-General of Van Diemen's Land during the late 1820s–early 1830s, Stephen's career intersected with the Black War, the final push by European settlers to destroy the resistance of the Tasmanian Aboriginal People. Following an incident where four company servants under the supervision of Alexander Goldie shot one Aboriginal woman and executed another with an axe on 21 August 1829, the case came before Stephens. Despite the proclamation of martial law clearly stating "that defenceless women and children be invariably spared", Stephen ruled that the natives were "open enemies to the King, in a state of actual warfare against him", and thus "the Pursuit of the Natives by Mr Goldie and his party, was lawful". At a meeting of 400 of Hobart's most notable inhabitants discussing the establishment of a town guard on 22 September 1830, once discussion had turned to the broader question of the object of the operation, Stephens was reported as saying "If you cannot [capture them] … I say boldly and broadly, exterminate!".

In 1829 Stephen discovered a fatal error in land titles throughout the Australian colonies. The matter was rectified by royal warrant and the issuing of fresh titles in 1830. In January 1833 Stephen was gazetted attorney-general and showed great industry and ability in the position. He was forced to resign in 1837, his health having suffered much from overwork, but after a holiday he took up private practice with great success.

New South Wales
On 30 April 1839, he was appointed as acting-judge of the Supreme Court of New South Wales and he arrived in Sydney on 7 May. In 1841, when judge Willis went to Port Phillip, Stephen became a puisne judge and from 1839 to 1844 he was also a judge of the administrative court.

He published in 1843 his Introduction to the Practice of the Supreme Court of New South Wales, and on 7 October 1844, he was appointed acting chief justice. His appointment as chief justice was confirmed in a dispatch from Lord Stanley dated 30 April 1845. He was to hold the position until 1873 and during that period not only carried out his judicial duties but advised the government on many complicated questions which arose in the legislature. In August 1852 he recommended that the second chamber under the new constitution should be partly nominated and partly elected. In May 1856 he was appointed President of the Legislative Council and held the position until January 1857. He was able to give the council the benefit of his experience by framing legislation dealing with land titles, the legal profession, and the administration of justice. He continued to hold his seat until November 1858 when judges were precluded from sitting in parliament.

In February 1860 he obtained 12 months leave of absence and visited Europe. On his return, he gave much consideration to the question of criminal law and was principally responsible for a criminal law amendment bill which although first brought before parliament in 1872, did not actually become law until 1883. In 1869 he also presided over the prominent case brought by Commander George Palmer against Thomas Pritchard and Captain Dagget of the Daphne. Commander Palmer had been sent out by the Royal Navy to investigate allegations of blackbirding, the illegal recruitment (including enslavement) of the indigenous populations of nearby Pacific islands or northern Queensland. Palmer found the Daphne in harbour at Levuka in Fiji fitted out like an "African slaver", and filled with Islanders on board looking emaciated and having little knowledge of why they were on the ship. The Daphne was owned by Henry Ross Lewin, a long time blackbirder who had been commissioned to import slaves for Robert Towns' sugar plantations (the entrepreneur after whom Townsville is named). Despite this, Sir Alfred Stephen found Pritchard and Dagget innocent on the grounds that the British Slave Trade Act 1839 did not apply to the South Pacific Ocean. In addition to this, Sir Stephen found that Captain Palmer had illegally seized Daphne and ordered him to pay reparations to Daggett and Pritchard. No evidence or statements were taken from the Islanders. This decision, which overrode the obvious humanitarian actions of a senior officer of the Royal Navy, gave further legitimacy to the blackbirding trade out of Queensland and allowed it to flourish.

He resigned his chief justiceship in 1873. He had administered the government between the departure of the Earl of Belmore in February 1872 and the arrival of Sir Hercules Robinson in June. He was appointed lieutenant-governor in 1875 and several times administered the government. He was a member of the legislative council from 1875 until 1890, taking an active part in the debates, and from 1880 he was president of the trustees of the national gallery. In 1883, with A. Oliver, he published Criminal Law Manual, comprising the Criminal Law Amendment Act of 1883, and towards the end of his life interested himself in the amending of the law of divorce. Among his writings on the subject was an article in the Contemporary Review for June 1891 in reply to one by W. E. Gladstone in the North American Review.

Stephen resigned from the legislative council in 1890 and lived in retirement. He was still comparatively vigorous when he passed his ninetieth birthday in August 1892 and never completely took to his bed. He faded quietly out of life on 15 October 1894, his intellect bright and clear to the last.

Family
The Stephen family is a prominent legal dynasty in Australia. Sir Alfred was the son of John Stephen, a judge of the Supreme Court of New South Wales. 

Stephen married Virginia, daughter of Matthew Consett, who died in 1837, and Eleanor daughter of the Rev. William Bedford, who died in 1886. There were nine children of each marriage and at the time of Stephen's death, he had 66 grandchildren.

He was knighted in 1846 and was a made a CB in 1862,  in 1874, GCMG in 1884, and privy councillor in 1893.

Of Stephen's sons, Alfred Hewlett Stephen, born in 1826, entered religious life, and, in 1869, became a canon of St Andrew's Cathedral, Sydney. Another, Sir Matthew Henry Stephen (1828–1920), became a puisne judge of the supreme court of New South Wales in 1887, and a third son, Hon. Septimus Alfred Stephen (1842-1901) was a distinguished lawyer and New South Wales politician. 

Other sons held prominent positions in Sydney. Of his grandsons, Edward Milner Stephen was appointed a supreme court judge at Sydney in 1929, and Brigadier-General Robert Campbell Stephen, served with distinction in the 1914-18 war. A great-grandson, Lieutenant Adrian Consett Stephen, killed in the same war, showed much promise as a writer. His Four Plays and An Australian in the R.F.A. were published posthumously in 1918.

Alfred's brother, George Milner Stephen (1812 – 1894), was a barrister with a significant political career in South Australia and Victoria. Another brother, John Stephen, (died 1854) was the earliest created alderman for the City of Melbourne.

See also
 List of judges of the Supreme Court of New South Wales

References

 

|-

1802 births
1894 deaths
Chief Justices of New South Wales
Lieutenant-Governors of New South Wales
Judges of the Supreme Court of New South Wales
Knights Grand Cross of the Order of St Michael and St George
Companions of the Order of the Bath
Members of the New South Wales Legislative Council
Presidents of the New South Wales Legislative Council
Directors and Presidents of the Art Gallery of New South Wales
People from Saint Kitts
Australian members of the Privy Council of the United Kingdom
Members of Lincoln's Inn
People educated at Charterhouse School
Colony of New South Wales judges
19th-century Australian politicians
Solicitors-General of Tasmania
19th-century Australian judges
English emigrants to colonial Australia